A flight nurse is a registered nurse who specialises in the field of providing comprehensive pre-hospital, emergency critical care, and hospital care to a vast scope of patients. The care of these patients is generally during aeromedical evacuation or rescue operations aboard helicopters, propeller aircraft or jet aircraft. On board a rescue aircraft you would find a flight nurse accompanied by flight medics and respiratory practitioners, as well as the option of a flight physician for comprehensive emergency and critical transport teams. The inclusion of a flight physician is more commonly seen in pediatric and neonatal transport teams.
A critical care flight nurse must be able to deal with all age groups with broad critical emergencies. With no physicians on site the nurses scope of practice is expanded. The critical care experience is transferred over to a flight nurse with impacting factors such as altitude and changes in pressure, gravitational forces, and weather (Mazur, R., 2018). Some patients may experience exacerbation because of factors related to the cabin environment including hypoxia, limited mobility, gas expansion, and risk of injury related to turbulence and resources with definitive care are limited (Rotta, A. T., 2020). Aeromedical evacuation crews coordinate with other organizations to plan for the safe and timely care and evacuation of patients. Crews must be prepared for patients with trauma and mental health illnesses (An, 2018).

Roles and duties 
A flight nurse is required to complete a copious amount of duties each and every call out. Listed below is a comprehensive list of these duties and responsibilities: 
 Flight nurses perform as a member of an aeromedical evacuation team on helicopters and propeller or jet aircraft
 Responsible for planning and preparing for aeromedical evacuation missions
 Expedite mission and initiate emergency treatment in absence of Flight Physician
 Provide in-flight management and nursing care for patients
 Evaluate individual patient in-flight needs
 Liaison between medical and operational aircrews and support personnel to promote patient comfort
 Responsible for maintaining patient care, comfort and safety
 Care for patients with both medical and traumatic issues
 Request appropriate medications, supplies and equipment to provide care to patient
 Must have training in mechanical ventilation, hemodynamic support, vasoactive medications and intensive care skills
 Specialized clinical skills in union with knowledge, theory, education and expertise in hospital and pre-hospital environments are required 
 Perform advanced medical procedures without supervision of a doctor such as intubation, ventilator management, chest tube insertion, intra-osseous line placement, central line placement, intra-aortic balloon pump management, management of pacing devices, titration of vasoactive medications, pain management, administration of anaesthetic medications for intubation, and in some cases, emotional and family care

Education 
National requirements for most flight nurse programs include:
 License as a registered nurse
 2–3 years of critical care experience and/or mobile intensive care unit (MICU) experience.
 Advanced cardiac life support (ACLS) certificate
 Pediatric advanced life support (PALS) certificate

Certification process and skills 

While specific skills that may be performed by the flight nurse, or the scope of practice, are not universal across the globe or even the United States, the flight nurse or any critical care transport member must log a series of hours to progress within this role.

According to the Association of Critical Care Transport (2020), critical care transport providers must document a minimum of 3,700 patient contact hours or have a minimum of 5 years' experience with direct patient care to have the necessary qualifications to act as a transport provider in addition to being a licensed RN in the state of transport. These providers must minimally have BLS or ACLS certifications.

The next step in progressing in this role is to obtain an Advanced Transport Certification including the CFRN and CTRN (ACCT,2020). This certification allows the nurse to provide a higher and more inclusive level of care.

After two years of critical care transport experience, the nurse can become a Critical Care Transport Provider (ACCT, 2020). This allows the nurse to assume the role as a primary caregiver for the patient who is being transferred.

By allowing the nurse to assume the role as a primary caregiver during critical care transport, the nurse is afforded more autonomy and a wider scope of practice. Each state and each country have own scope of practice for the critical care transport, or flight nurse. Based on skills that the nurse has trained in they may perform tasks such as intubation, thoracostomy with or without mechanical ventilation, chest tube placement, management of cardiovascular devices such as Extracorporeal Membrane Oxygenation (ECMO) or Ventricular Assist Devices (VADs), in-flight ultrasound, and initiation of pharmacological interventions (ACCT,2020). These skills may only be performed by the nurse who is practicing within their scope of practice and who has trained to competently complete these skills.

Additional requirements may include:
 Neonatal Resuscitation Program (NRP)
 Nationally recognized trauma program such as Pre Hospital Trauma Life Support (PHTLS)
 Basic Trauma Life Support (BTLS), Trauma Nurse Core Course (TNCC), or Transport Nurse Advanced Trauma Course (TNATC)
 Certifications such as Critical Care certification (CCRN), Certified Emergency Nurse (CEN), or Certified Flight Registered Nurse (CFRN)

Helpful, but may not be required:
 EMT or EMT-P (paramedic) certification with field experience (some states require flight nurses to be certified as EMTs or EMT-Ps)
Simulations programs

 Simulation programs to prepare flight nurses have been shown to adequately mimic real world scenarios, In a study conduct at Case Western Reserve University's flight nurse program students reported that the flight simulator had felt like an actual rotor cuff transport. Additionally, heart rates were tracked to measure the stress response and rates were increased from 77 before the simulation to 100 at the peak, at the conclusion HR resolved to 72, the p value was <0.001.

Credentialing 
 Certified Emergency Nurse (CEN)
 Certified Flight Registered Nurse (CFRN)
 Critical Care Registered Nurse (CCRN)

Types

Civilian
 Works for hospitals, federal, state and local governments, private medical evacuation firms, fire departments and other agencies.

Military
 Army Air Force Evacuation Service
 Member of aeromedical evacuation crew
 Senior medical member of aeromedical evacuation team on Continental United States (CONUS)
 Works in intra-theatre and inter-theatre flights to provide in-flight management and nursing care
 Plan/Prepare aeromedical evacuation missions and prepare patient care facilitation plan

Flight Nursing's Role in Community Health

The flight nurse is vital to the community. They aid in transport and care for the critically ill patient in extreme circumstances. These nurses possess a wide scope of practice that allows them to care for these patients in a variety of setting. The flight nurse plays a critical role in the rescues of individuals who need fast, and otherwise inaccessible transport to receive emergency care. These nurses have been used in both the military and civilian setting to perform rescue missions. The services that they provide expand the reach of hospitals and allow care to take place in rural, desert, or otherwise unreachable locations including mountains, islands, etc. (Scuissiato et al., 2012). Therefore, the flight nurse expands access of care to reach all community regions in critical care situations.

Australia  
Australia has an estimated 20% of land recognised as desert with a rather small population density. Providing health care to these remote rural towns can prove to be quite laborious. Australia provides a number of organisations that flight nurses are under employment of.

United States 
In the United States there are approximately 550,000 people who require emergency or standard medical transport every year. Situations involving the need for patients to travel via air transport include patients who have been involved in a bad accident and require transport to an intensive care, patient needs a transplant, or a stable patient who has a medical condition that wants to move closer to family. Flight nursing also plays a critical role in transporting a critically ill patient who lives in a rural community to a hospital that has the resources necessary to provide the care needed to the patient. Teams involved in the air transport of a patient can include nurse/nurse, nurse/paramedic, nurse/physician, nurse/respiratory therapist, or paramedic/paramedic, depending on the needs of the patient. When transporting a patient who is on vasoactive medications or vasodilator medications, the nurse is responsible for titrating the drips to maintain the hemodynamic parameters within the ordered range and the critical care needed for the patient.

See also 
 Aerospace Medical Association
 Air Medical Services
 Flight Nurse Badge (U.S.)
 RAF Medical Services
 Royal Flying Doctor Service of Australia

References 

Association of Critical Care Transport. (2020). Critical care transport standards (Vol. 1). Platte City, MO: Association of Critical Care Transport.

Scuissiato, D. R., Boffi, L. V., Rocha, R. D., Montezeli, J. H., Bordin, M. T., & Peres, A. M. (2012). Understanding on-board nurses about their role in the multiprofessional aeromedical transport team. Brazilian Journal of Nursing, 65(4), 614–620. doi:10.1590/s0034-71672012000400010

Further reading 
 
 
 An Occupational Paradox: Why Do We Love Really Tough Jobs? (2018). Critical Care Nurse, 38(2), 59. https://proxy.ulib.csuohio.edu:2096/10.4037/ccn2018919
 Mazur, R., Triggs, P., & Gall, C. (2018). Critical care up in the air. Canadian Journal of Critical Care Nursing, 29(2), 28–29.
 Rotta, A. T., Alves, P. M., Nerwich, N., & Shein, S. L. (2020). Characterization of In-Flight Medical Events Involving Children on Commercial Airline Flights. Annals of Emergency Medicine, 75(1), 66–74. https://proxy.ulib.csuohio.edu:2096/10.1016/j.annemergmed.2019.06.004

External links 
 Air & Surface Transport Nurses Association
 Flightweb

Community nursing
Air ambulance services